The Brazilian whitetail dogfish (Squalus albicaudus) is a dogfish described in 2016. It is a member of the family Squalidae, found off the coast of Brazil, at depths between 195 – 421 meters.

References

Squalus
Fish of Brazil
Fish described in 2016